William H. Mann (born William Isaiah Erlichman; December 20, 1968) is a Grammy-nominated American songwriter, record producer and founder of independent music publishing company Green & Bloom/Topline, as well as chairman of management firm Manncom. In 2021, alongside partner Benton James, he launched Proof Of Concept, a talent development and creative media services firm. Later that same year, in partnership with Warner Music Group’s ADA Worldwide, Mann and James announced the launch of joint venture label, icons+giants.

Over a 25-year period, Mann has written songs and/or produced records for an array of artists, including P!nk, John Legend, Celine Dion, Take That, Backstreet Boys, Cher, David Guetta, Kelly Rowland, Jessica Simpson, Sheryl Crow, Burt Bacharach, Bebe Rexha, Ty Dolla $ign, Ricky Martin, Anastacia, Art Garfunkel, Sting, Joss Stone, Robyn, Grover Washington Jr., Chaka Khan, Boyzone, Paula Abdul, Helene Fischer, Cher Lloyd, Paul Van Dyk, Hilary Duff, Jennifer Brown and Carole King.

Since writing his first top 10 hit in the UK for EMI in 1995 with "3 Is Family" by Dana Dawson, Mann has achieved several Top 40 hits around the world (including several Top 10s and number 1s), with cumulative album sales of over 110 million.

Early life and education
He was born in Philadelphia, Pennsylvania as the youngest of three children. Born to middle class parents, Mann lived with his mother in Philadelphia’s inner city after his parents’ divorce. From early childhood, he began experimenting with songwriting and taught himself guitar, piano, bass, harmonica, baritone horn, and flute. By age 12, Mann had put together several bands with other young local musicians, including musicians such as Steven Wolf, Clayton Sears and Adam Dorn (a.k.a. Mocean Worker).

Mann attended the Philadelphia High School for the Creative & Performing Arts (CAPA) for Vocal Music, alongside members of Boyz II Men, The Roots, Christian McBride and Joey DeFrancesco, receiving his diploma in three years. Three years after high school, in 1989, he received his bachelor’s degree from Hampshire College in Amherst, Massachusetts.

Career

Artist
Mann began his professional career by living in a car for nearly two years as a traveling musician. After stops in Los Angeles, San Francisco, Miami and London, Mann landed in New York, where a chance encounter with producer Ric Wake, put together by songwriter/performer Gregg Wattenberg, saw Wake introduce Mann to then A&M Records label head, Al Cafaro; Mann was ultimately signed to Wake for publishing, to Wake’s production company, and to Wake’s imprint DV8 Records, distributed by A&M.

The deal led to two solo releases: 1996’s Billy Mann and 1998’s Earthbound. Inspired by the loss of his first wife Rema Hort Mann, to stomach cancer nine months after they were married, Earthbound was co-produced by Mann and David Kershenbaum and featured co-writes with and an appearance by early mentor Carole King.

Songwriter
Mann has written songs for artists across a number of genres including pop, rock, dance, R&B, reggae, house and country. Self-publishing his own catalog, he also has publishing credits with Sony/ATV, Warner/Chappell, Verse and BMG Chrysalis. Mann’s songwriting collaborators have included artists such as Carole King, Rudy Perez, Burt Bacharach, Desmond Child, Graham Lyle and Walter Afanasieff, as well as new producer/songwriters like Christian Medice, David Spencer and Supah Mario.
Of particular note is Mann's long-standing collaboration with P!nk, another Philadelphia native, who was introduced to Mann in 2002 by her then co-manager Craig Logan. They since have co-written such songs as "God Is a DJ", "Stupid Girls", "Dear Mr. President", "Nobody Knows", "I’m Not Dead", "Crystal Ball", "Glitter in the Air", "Bridge of Light", "The Truth About Love" and "Beam Me Up". They have twice been nominated for Grammy Awards, for "Stupid Girls" and "The Truth About Love".  In 2017, Mann co-wrote and produced "I Am Here" on P!nk's million selling album Beautiful Trauma.  Variety profiled the long-standing partnership between the artist and Mann just after the album's release. P!nk and Mann continued their catalog of songs in 2019 on the #1 platinum Hurts 2B Human with "The Last Song Of Your Life."

Record producer
About.com named Mann one of the Top 10 Producers of 2006. In addition to some of the artists listed above, he has worked in a production capacity with such Grammy-winning producer legends as Peter Asher, Walter Afanasieff, David Foster and James Stroud.

Production and writing credits include
P!nk: Try This, I'm Not Dead, Funhouse, Greatest Hits… So Far, The Truth About Love, Beautiful Trauma, Hurts 2B Human, All I Know So Far
Cher: Closer to the Truth
Celine Dion: Let’s Talk About Love
Josh Groban: Closer (Website Exclusive version)
Backstreet Boys: Never Gone, Unbreakable
Michael Bolton: Only a Woman Like You
Teddy Geiger: Step Ladder, Underage Thinking, Snow Blankets the Night
Ricky Martin: Life
Martina McBride: Emotions
Robyn: My Truth
Kelly Rowland: Simply Deep, Ms. Kelly
Jonas Bros: It’s About Time
Hall & Oates: Do It for Love
Jessica Simpson: Irresistible, In This Skin
Joss Stone: Introducing Joss Stone
Take That: Beautiful World
Paul van Dyk: Out There and Back
Amanda Marshall: Everybody’s Got a Story
Seeed: Seeed
Frida Gold: Liebe Ist Meine Religion
Natalie Imbruglia: Male
Jennifer Brown Vera
Grover Washington Jr., Soulful Strut
Boyzone, A Different Beat
Helene Fischer, Helene Fischer
Draco Rosa, Mad Love
Jacob Whitesides, A Piece Of Me, Faces On Film, Why?
Art Garfunkel, Everything Waits To Be Noticed
Brian Litrell, Welcome Home You
Oh Honey, Sincerely Yours
John Legend, Love In The Future
Tiziano Ferro, El Amore Es Una Cosa Simpl, Breathe Gentle
Dixie D’Amelio, Be Happy
Alex Aiono, Unloving You, The Gospel At 23
Delta Goodrem Mistaken Identity (Delta Goodrem album), Last Night On Earth,  Title Track

Show Producer 
In the summer of 2021, Mann collaborated with Benton James along with Rainmaker Holding Group’s Clay Pecorin, Russell Geyser, Jason Halio, and Zak Tanjeloff to create Song House Live, a reality show that brought musical influencers/social media creators together in a luxury house in upstate New York for eight weeks as they create content and record music in a bid to win a record deal with Capitol Music Group. The experience was live streamed on multiple cameras throughout the property. At the end of the competition, Tyler Brash was announced as the winner. In addition to Song House Live, Mann is a Consulting Producer of The D'Amelio Show which was released on HULU in September 2021.

Entrepreneur
In 2001, Mann founded Stealth Entertainment in New York City's garment district. The one-man studio grew into a team of a half dozen executives who went on to develop multi-platinum, award-winning and chart-topping artists, songwriters, producers and mixing engineers like Andy Zulla, Christopher Rojas, Teddy Geiger, Esmee Denters and Pete Wallace. Mann is widely known for discovering Oscar-winning actor Emma Stone, Teddy Geiger, Jacob Whitesides and Charli D'Amelio as well as sister Dixie D'Amelio, among others. 

In addition to developing talent, Stealth built partnerships with organizations like Seventeen Magazine, Columbia Records, SonyBMG Special Projects, Target, Levi's and other brands on behalf of the company and its roster. Stealth was acquired as part of Mann's later move to EMI.

As a consultant, Mann has worked with Zomba Group, Sony Music Entertainment, Sony Pictures Television, Warner-Chappell, Red Bull Media House, BMG Chrysalis, Bliss Legal and BMG International. He has also been featured as a guest music commentator on The Today Show

He is an advisor on Scenebot Stage and sits on the investor board of Angel Ventures, Mexico.

Executive
In November 2007, Mann joined EMI Music as creative advisor and a member of the operating board. Soon after, he was appointed chief creative officer.

His years with the company saw the development of some of EMI’s most successful international artists and partnerships, including David Guetta, Pablo Alboran, Helene Fischer, Bebe, Juan Luis Guerra, Tiziano Ferro, Robyn, Panda, Paty Cantu, Belinda, Wind Up and Movic. Additionally, he helped develop artist management initiatives in several countries (including Spain, Germany, Italy and the United States) in order to expand the way EMI developed talent. Throughout his EMI tenure, Mann also acted as the non-executive chairman for Stealth Entertainment, which in its latter years focused primarily on songwriter/producer management.

During EMI’s most turbulent period, Mann worked under four CEOs in a mere three years, and carried on through each regime change. EMI’s final CEO Roger Faxon announced Mann’s departure from the company.

In January 2011, Mann was named president of creative, BMG North America, overseeing the creative staff in New York, Los Angeles, and Nashville in managing the roster integration of recently acquired companies, and leading efforts to attract, develop, and sign new content.

At the end of 2011, Mann founded Manncom Creative Partners, a talent and services company alongside a publishing venture with BMG, Green & Bloom/Topline. In 2013, BMG extended its investment in Green & Bloom. In 2019, Green & Bloom/Topline has celebrated a series of successes with lovelytheband, Supah Mario, Flawless, Dani Poppitt and others.

References

External links
 

1968 births
Living people
American country songwriters
American male songwriters
American rock songwriters
Record producers from New York (state)
Record producers from Pennsylvania
Musicians from New York (state)
Sony Music Publishing artists
Songwriters from New York (state)
Songwriters from Pennsylvania